Ignotornis was a bird ichnogenus dating back to the Barremian-Cenomanian of Colorado, Canada and South Korea.

Footnotes

References
 Lockley, M. G., Janke, P., and Theisen, L., 2001, First reports of bird and  ornithopod tracks from the Lakota Formation (Early Cretaceous), Black Hills,  South Dakota: In: Mesozoic Vertebrate Life, edited by Tanke, D. H., and Carpenter,  K., Indiana University Press, pp. 443–452.

Bird trace fossils